Yira Collins Sor (born 24 July 2000) is a Nigerian professional footballer who plays as a winger for Genk.

Club career
Sor began his career at Port Harcourt-based Family Love Academy, before moving to 36 Lion in Lagos. In February 2021, Sor signed for Czech First League club Baník Ostrava. 

On 21 January 2022, after three league goals and five assists during the first half of the 2021–22 season, Slavia Prague confirmed the signing of Sor on a contract until December 2026, with compatriot Ubong Ekpai being loaned to Baník Ostrava as part of the deal. On 24 February 2022, Sor scored his first goals for Slavia Prague, scoring twice in a 3–2 UEFA Europa Conference League win over Fenerbahçe. Sor scored two goals again in the Round of 16 of the competition in the first leg against LASK.

On 28 December 2022, Belgian club Genk announced the signing of Sor on a contract until the summer of 2027.

International career
Sor made two appearances for Nigeria's under-20's at the 2019 FIFA U-20 World Cup in Poland.

Career statistics

Club

References

External links
 

2000 births
Living people
Sportspeople from Lagos
Nigerian footballers
Association football wingers
Nigeria youth international footballers
FC Baník Ostrava players
SK Slavia Prague players
K.R.C. Genk players
Czech First League players
Nigerian expatriate footballers
Nigerian expatriate sportspeople in the Czech Republic
Expatriate footballers in the Czech Republic
Nigeria under-20 international footballers